June was an American indie rock band from Chapel Hill, North Carolina.

History
June was active in Chapel Hill from 1992 to 1996, playing "moody, highly literate guitar-pop" with a "pretty but not wispy" sound. The band released three singles (one of them produced by Mitch Easter) and became the subject of a minor bidding war before signing to Beggars Banquet in 1995. Their first album, I Am Beautiful, was recorded in Nashville, Tennessee, and released in spring 1996. The band broke up in August 1996, after a final live performance that month at an all-day music festival held at Durham Athletic Park.

Members
Kat Cook - vocals
John Price - guitar
Tricia Tuttle - guitar and vocals
Andy Magowan - bass guitar, violin
Mathew Gross - drums (1992–1994)
John Howie Jr. - drums (1995–1996)
Cook and Tuttle were previously heard together in Zo, a Charlotte band.

Discography
I Am Beautiful (1996)

Singles
"I Am Beautiful" / "Theme of the Anti-Hero" (spring 1993, Friction Media; out of print)
"Stripteaser" / "Long Dance" (autumn 1993, Friction Media; out of print)
"Genius" / "All of Me" (1994, Squealer Records)

References

External links
 Squealer Records site
June music fan site

Musical groups established in 1992
Musical groups disestablished in 1996
Musical groups from Chapel Hill-Carrboro, North Carolina